Jason Delesalle is a Paralympic athlete from Canada competing mainly in category P12 pentathlon events.	
	
He competed in the 1992 Summer Paralympics in Barcelona, Spain. There he won a silver medal in the men's Javelin throw - B3 event and went out in the first round of the men's 100 metres - B3 event.  He also competed at the 1996 Summer Paralympics in Atlanta, United States. There he won a gold medal in the men's Pentathlon - P12 event, a bronze medal in the men's Discus throw - F12 event and finished fourth in the men's Javelin throw - F12 event. He also competed at the 2000 Summer Paralympics in Sydney, Australia.  There he finished seventh in the men's Discus throw - F13 event

External links
 

Paralympic track and field athletes of Canada
Athletes (track and field) at the 1992 Summer Paralympics
Athletes (track and field) at the 1996 Summer Paralympics
Athletes (track and field) at the 2000 Summer Paralympics
Paralympic gold medalists for Canada
Paralympic silver medalists for Canada
Paralympic bronze medalists for Canada
Living people
Medalists at the 1992 Summer Paralympics
Medalists at the 1996 Summer Paralympics
Year of birth missing (living people)
Paralympic medalists in athletics (track and field)
Canadian male discus throwers
Canadian male javelin throwers
Canadian pentathletes
Visually impaired discus throwers
Visually impaired javelin throwers
Paralympic discus throwers
Paralympic javelin throwers